Fistulinella alfaroae is a bolete fungus in the family Boletaceae found in Costa Rica. It grows with Monotropa under oak in montane forest. It was described as new to science in 1991.

References

External links

Boletaceae
Fungi described in 1991
Fungi of Central America